Robots and Changelings is the second collection of fantasy and science fiction stories by Lester del Rey, published by Ballantine Books in 1957.

Contents
 "The Pipes of Pan" (Unknown 1940)
 "Little Jimmy" F&SF 1957)
 "The Coppersmith" (Unknown 1939)
 "No Strings Attached" (If 1954)
 "The Still Waters" (Fantastic Universe 1955)
 "Kindness" (Astounding 1944)
 "Stability" (Vortex 1953)
 "Keepers of the House" (Fantastic Universe 1956)
 "Uneasy Lies the Head" (Ten Story Fantasy 1951)
 "The Monster" (Argosy 1951)
 "Into Thy Hands" (Astounding 1945)

"The Coppersmith" was originally published as "Ellowan Coppersmith". "The Still Waters was originally published as "In the Still Waters."

Reception
Floyd C. Gale wrote that all of the stories "have the stamp of [del Rey's] compassion [for the unhuman]". Damon Knight found the stories "memorable for their quiet compassion." Newspaper reviewer Earl Heath described the book as "good and different stories [which] will amuse you, arouse you, and perhaps chill you a bit."

References

1957 short story collections
Fantasy short story collections
Science fiction short story collections
Books with cover art by Richard M. Powers
Ballantine Books books